National Route 146 is a national highway of Japan connecting Naganohara, Gunma and Karuizawa, Nagano in Japan, with a total length of 30.2 km (18.77 mi).

References

146
Roads in Gunma Prefecture
Roads in Nagano Prefecture